Kazi Abul Kashem is a Bangladesh Awami League politician and the former Member of Parliament of Patuakhali-4.

Career
Kashem was elected to parliament from Patuakhali-4 as a Bangladesh Awami League candidate in 1973. Kazi Abul Kashem Stadium was named after him.

References

Awami League politicians
Living people
1st Jatiya Sangsad members
Year of birth missing (living people)